Prisons We Choose to Live Inside is a collection of five essays by the British writer Doris Lessing, which were previously delivered as the 1985 Massey Lectures.

The Essays
The five collected essays are generally meant to be read in order though they can be read independently. The essays appear in the collection in the order that they were delivered as lectures. The titles of the essays are:

 When In the Future They Look Back On Us
 You Are Damned, We Are Saved
 Switching Off to See "Dallas"
 Group Minds
 Laboratories of Social Change

External links
 CBC Radio Ideas Audio Archive :

References

1986 books
Massey Lectures books
Works by Doris Lessing